Chemical & Engineering News publishes an annual list of the world's largest chemical producers by sales, excluding formulated products such as pharmaceutical drugs and coatings.

In 2018, Forty-eight of the companies on the list disclosed chemical profits, which totaled , an increase of 1.3% from 2017. The average profit margin for chemical operations for these companies was 9.6%.

Top fifty producers by sales (2021)

Top fifty producers by sales (2018)

B.Estimate by Chemical and Engineering News.
C.Sales include a significant amount of non-chemical products.
D.Chemical sales less administrative expenses and cost of sales.

Largest companies since 1988
Since Chemical & Engineering News began keeping records in 1989, BASF has been the world's largest chemical producer by annual sales more frequently than any other company. The other companies that have headed the list are Dow Chemical, DowDuPont (which broke up into a Dow, a new DuPont, and Corteva Agriscience in 2019), Hoechst (which merged with Rhône-Poulenc in 1999 and is now a subsidiary of Sanofi), ICI (acquired by AkzoNobel in 2008) and Bayer.

A.Foreign currencies converted to USD using average exchange rates of that year.

References

Chemical industry
Chemical
Economy-related lists of superlatives